Belle is a city in northeast Maries County and extending north into southeast Osage County in the U.S. state of Missouri. The population was 1,381 at the 2020 census.

The Osage County portion of Belle is part of the Jefferson City, Missouri Metropolitan Statistical Area.

History
A post office called Belle has been in operation since 1895. It is unclear why the name Belle was applied to this community. Belle was a depot on the Chicago, Rock Island and Pacific Railroad, commonly known as the Rock Island.

Geography
Belle is located at the intersection of Missouri routes 28 and 89. Vienna is about fourteen miles to the southwest along routes 28 and 42. Bland in Gasconade County is approximately four miles to the east-northeast along Route 28. Rich Fountain is about 11 miles to the northwest along Route 89. The Gasconade River flows past approximately five miles to the southwest.

Demographics

2010 census
As of the census of 2010, there were 1,545 people, 659 households, and 408 families living in the city. The racial makeup of the city was 97.5% White, 0.2% African American, 0.1% Native American, 0.6% from other races, and 1.6% from two or more races. Hispanic or Latino of any race were 1.4% of the population.

There were 659 households, of which 33.1% had children under the age of 18 living with them, 41.0% were married couples living together, 15.2% had a female householder with no husband present, 5.8% had a male householder with no wife present, and 38.1% were non-families. 33.1% of all households were made up of individuals, and 17% had someone living alone who was 65 years of age or older. The average household size was 2.34 and the average family size was 2.91.

The median age in the city was 36.2 years. 26.7% of residents were under the age of 18; 8.6% were between the ages of 18 and 24; 24.4% were from 25 to 44; 24.5% were from 45 to 64; and 15.7% were 65 years of age or older. The gender makeup of the city was 48.6% male and 51.4% female.

2000 census
As of the census of 2000, there were 1,344 people, 595 households, and 357 families living in the city. The population density was 1,062.1 people per square mile (408.6/km2). There were 652 housing units at an average density of 515.2 per square mile (198.2/km2). The racial makeup of the city was 97.10% White, 0.07% African American, 0.52% Native American, 0.60% from other races, and 1.71% from two or more races. Hispanic or Latino of any race were 1.12% of the population.

There were 595 households, out of which 29.9% had children under the age of 18 living with them, 41.3% were married couples living together, 13.6% had a female householder with no husband present, and 40.0% were non-families. 36.0% of all households were made up of individuals, and 19.5% had someone living alone who was 65 years of age or older. The average household size was 2.23 and the average family size was 2.83.

In the city, the population was spread out, with 26.0% under the age of 18, 10.2% from 18 to 24, 24.9% from 25 to 44, 20.2% from 45 to 64, and 18.8% who were 65 years of age or older. The median age was 36 years. For every 100 females, there were 82.9 males. For every 100 females age 18 and over, there were 74.6 males.

The median income for a household in the city was $24,091, and the median income for a family was $35,982. Males had a median income of $27,917 versus $17,857 for females. The per capita income for the city was $17,785. About 14.7% of families and 19.3% of the population were below the poverty line, including 31.3% of those under age 18 and 15.2% of those age 65 or over.

Education
Maries County R-II School District operates Belle Elementary and High School in the community.

Belle has a public library, a branch of the Heartland Regional Library System.

References

External links
 Historic maps of Belle in the Sanborn Maps of Missouri Collection at the University of Missouri

 

Cities in Maries County, Missouri
Cities in Osage County, Missouri
Cities in Missouri
Jefferson City metropolitan area